Absurd Planet is a nature documentary web television series produced by Condé Nast Entertainment and Love Productions USA and distributed by Netflix. The series follows our planet's most absurd animals.

Cast 
 Afi Ekulona as Mother Nature
 Ashlee Willis - As herself
 Paul Raff - As himself
 Christopher Zane Gordon - As himself
 Alfonso Lopez - As himself (12 episodes)/Associate Story Producer (12 episodes)
 Shalla Yudelevich - As herself (5 episodes)/Associate Producer (12 episodes)
 Steven Marmalstein - As himself (12 episodes)/Executive Producer (12 episodes)
 Thomas Mitchell - As himself (12 episodes)/Editor (12 episodes)
 Jeff Wild - As himself (12 episodes)/Consulting Producer (12 episodes)
 Colee Whitacre - As herself (8 episodes)/Story Assistant (11 episodes)
 Rich Gustus - As himself (10 episodes)/Executive in Charge (12 episodes)
 Daniel Brown - As himself (3 episodes)/Editor (10 episodes)
 Vanessa Fragoso
 Anna Pousho	
 Paul Raff	
 Mae Bartek	
 Bushra Butt	
 Sami Clark	
 Steve Collins	
 Melissa Fragoso	
 Alexandra Komisaruk
 Seiko Murakami	
 Kayla Murray	
 Ignacio Pinerua	
 Karen Segal	
 Gina Stickley	- As Harriett the Hermit Crab

Release 
Absurd Planet was released on April 22, 2020 on Netflix.

References

External links
 
 

2020 American television series debuts
2020s American documentary television series
Documentary films about nature
English-language Netflix original programming
Netflix original documentary television series